A Futuro house, or Futuro Pod, is a round, prefabricated house designed by Finnish architect Matti Suuronen, of which fewer than 100 were built during the late 1960s and early 1970s. The shape, reminiscent of a flying saucer, and the structure's airplane hatch entrance has made the houses sought after by collectors.

History 

The Futuro house was a product of post-war Finland, reflecting the period's faith in technology, the conquering of space, unprecedented economic growth, and an increase in leisure time. It was designed by Suuronen as a ski cabin that would be "quick to heat and easy to construct in rough terrain". The result was a universally transportable home that had the ability to be mass replicated and situated in almost any environment.

The material chosen for the project—fiberglass-reinforced polyester plastic—was familiar to Suuronen and was previously used in the design of a large plastic dome for the roof of a grain silo in Seinäjoki. To facilitate transport, the house consisted of 16 elements that were bolted together to form the floor and the roof. The project could be constructed on-site, or dismantled and reassembled on-site in two days, or even airlifted in one piece by helicopter to the site. The only necessity on site for its placement were four concrete piers, so the project could occupy nearly any topography.

An excerpt from a February 1970 copy of Architecture d’aujourd’hui describes "Futuro" as:

By the mid-1970s, the house was taken off the market. From the beginning, it had been met with public hostility. Its avant-garde appearance and unfamiliar material influenced the public's reluctance to accept the Futuro House.

The first Futuro House that was erected near Lake Puulavesi in Finland elicited public protest because it looked too unnatural for the rustic environment. In the United States, Futuro Houses were banned from many municipalities by zoning regulations. Banks were reluctant to finance them. Some were vandalised. Some customers who committed to buy them backed out and forfeited their non-refundable $1,000 deposits. Some have been destroyed. In 1999, the city of Tampa ordered a Futuro House demolished. Shortly after the turn of the century, a Futuro House was purchased on Broadkill Beach, Delaware, United States, and destroyed to make way for a double-wide modular home. Some have been vandalised in drive-by shootings.

The oil crisis of 1973 led to an abrupt halt in plastic production. Synthetics became very expensive to produce. Additionally, the public was shifting their view of plastics from a miracle material to an ecological concern. These problems provide context to the discontinuation of the Futuro House. Fewer than 100 were made and it is estimated that today around 60 of the original Futuro Houses survive, owned mostly by private individuals. The prototype (serial number 000) is in the collection of Museum Boijmans Van Beuningen in Rotterdam, The Netherlands. The Futuro no. 001, the only other Futuro currently in a public collection, is in the possession of the WeeGee Exhibition Centre in Espoo, Finland.

There are approximately 63 confirmed Futuro Houses in existence across the world. They are in Australia, Denmark, Estonia, Finland, France, Germany, Greece, Japan, The Netherlands, New Zealand, Norway, Ukraine, Russia, Sweden, South Africa, Taiwan, United Kingdom, and the United States of America.

Conservation 

In 2010, Finnish conservator Anna-Maija Kuitunen made a damage assessment plan for the first Futuro ever made (serial number 001). This was done as her final thesis for the Metropolia University of Applied Sciences in Finland ("Futuro no. 001 – documentation and evaluation of preservation need"). The thesis is openly available via the Finnish Theses database and contains a large number of indoor detail photographs and drawings of the Futuro House.

A UK artist, Craig Barnes, purchased and restored a Futuro house in 2013 – 14. He had discovered the wreck whilst on holiday in South Africa and had it shipped back to the UK before commencing restoration. The Futuro house—the only one in the UK—was on display to the public as part of an exhibition on the rooftop of Matt's Gallery, London (until December 2014); the house was featured on the fourth series of the Channel 4 programme George Clarke's Amazing Spaces (Ep. 2).

The Swedish Air Force Museum is restoring a Futuro house. It will be placed in front of the museum at the new playground during May 2021.

One Futuro house was found to be biodegrading due to cyanobacteria and archaea.

Marketing and media 
The Futuro home was primarily marketed towards young adults as an avant-garde retreat. Their promotion emphasized the versatility of the home in different locations and an excerpt from a Playboy Magazine advertisement reads, "The FUTURO's steel-legged base is adaptable to virtually any terrain, from flatground to a 20 degree incline ... Ideal for Beach, Skiing, Mountain areas and commercial uses." However, a key limitation to this narrative was the need for electricity and plumbing to be installed in order for the structure to be fully habitable. Many surviving structures have been retrofitted to allow for these needs and as a result the form Suuronen intended is compromised.

Uses 
The Futuro House has had many departures from its intended use as a ski chalet.

Australia 

One has been located at South Morang, (Melbourne, Victoria) go kart track for more than 25 years where it has been used as a storage unit at the track. Duncan McIntyre bought the Futuro and moved it from its original location in Greensborough (Melbourne, Victoria) to the track. Duncan bought it from a real estate agent who used the Futuro as a temporary booth for sales of land at a new housing estate called Apollo Parkways.

A Futuro House was used as a green room for artists at the Falls Festival in Lorne (Victoria), before its Kyneton owner sold it in 2016 to be shipped to Perth (Australia). Another Futuro House has been in Perth since the late 60s placed on the corner of two roads. Lost Perth Spaceship

One house was located in Darwin and was destroyed by Cyclone Tracy in 1974.

The final houses are located in Deep Creek, South Australia, and on the campus grounds of the University of Canberra. This Futuro, thought to be manufactured in New Zealand, arrived in Canberra in 1972. It spent time at the Canberra Space Dome (Planetarium) and Observatory in Dickson in 1997 and arrived at the university in 2011.

New Zealand 
Two Futuro Houses were transported to Christchurch New Zealand for the 1974 New Zealand British Commonwealth Games. These structures, referred to as "Space Banks", were used by the Bank of New Zealand as temporary banking structures. Following the games, the Futuro Houses were put up for sale.

United States 
Futuro Homes in the USA were manufactured by the Futuro Corporation of Philadelphia. Some still stand today and many of these structures existed in New Jersey.

At least nine standard Futuro Houses and one Futuro House with eight windows were constructed in New Jersey in the 1970s to 1980s. However, many did not last past the 1980s and were demolished. These pods were installed mostly in shopping centre parking lots. At least one of each model served as small-scale bank branches. This use of these Futuro houses was likely due to zoning regulations at the time that would have made it difficult to live in one.

A Futuro House in Frisco, NC remains a roadside attraction in the Outer Banks. Covered in alien memorabilia and exterior modifications, it had fallen into disrepair. The house caught on fire on 19 October 2022, destroying the structure.

Documentary
In 1998, Finnish film director Mika Taanila made a short documentary film FuturoA New Stance For Tomorrow about the Futuro house.

In 1969, the Australian Broadcasting Corporation (ABC) shot a piece on the first kit shipped to Australia.

See also 
Dymaxion house
Sanzhi UFO houses
Venturo

References 

Prefabricated houses
Houses in Finland
Modernist architecture in Finland
UFO culture